Rodney Elliott Bernstein (born 15 December 1937) is a former Irish cricketer. A right-handed batsman and right-arm fast-medium bowler, he made his debut for Ireland against the MCC in September 1960 and went on to play for them on eight occasions, his last match coming against Scotland in July 1962. All but two of his matches had first-class status.

References

CricketEurope Stats Zone profile

1937 births
Living people
Irish cricketers
Cricketers from Dublin (city)